The Hun Within is a 1918 American silent war drama thriller film directed by Chester Withey and starring Dorothy Gish and George Fawcett. It was written by historic Biograph directors D. W. Griffith and Stanner E. V. Taylor.

Cast
Dorothy Gish as Beth
George Fawcett as Henry Wagner
Charles K. Gerrard as Karl Wagner
Douglas MacLean as Frank Douglas
Herbert Sutch as Krippen (*as Bert Sutch)
Max Davidson as Max
Lillian Clark as Leone (*as Lillian Clarke)
Robert Anderson as Krug
Erich von Stroheim as Von Bickel
Adolph Lestina as Beth's Father
Kate Bruce as Kate's Mother

Description
"Nothing is sacred to the German spy in our midst love, honor or the sanctity of the home; and so the American-born son of a German American father became a Hun, while the father stood up for his adopted country."

Preservation status
A copy is preserved at the Cinematheque Francaise.

References

External links

1918 films
American silent feature films
Films directed by Chester Withey
Paramount Pictures films
American black-and-white films
American thriller films
1910s thriller films
1918 drama films
1910s American films
Silent thriller films
Silent war films
Silent American drama films